Meeru Island (also known as Meerufenfushi) is an island on the easternmost tip of North Malé Atoll (Kaafu Atoll) in the Maldives. It is located South West of Sri Lanka on the equator, some 50 kilometres from the capital Male.

The island is formed above peaks emerging from the depths of the ocean, upon layers of both living and dead coral, and remnants of other marine life. Coconut palms towering above dense shrubs and hardy plants protecting the shores from erosion are natural features. The island is 1200 meters long by 350 meters wide, about 32 hectares. A speedboat transfer from Velana International Airport is a 55-minute ride.

References

External links
 Meeru Island Web Site

Islands of the Maldives
Resorts in the Maldives